Feller College, also known as Institut Feller, was a boarding school located in Grande-Ligne (now Saint-Blaise-sur-Richelieu) which closed its doors in 1967.

History 
It was founded in 1836 by Henriette Feller of Lausanne, a Swiss Protestant missionary, in the small farming community of Grande-Ligne, 35 miles southeast of Montreal, Quebec).It grew to become a significant co-educational institution with imposing four-story central building and adjoining church, farm, and several faculty homes. In 1849, the mission and the school became partners with the Canadian Baptist Missionary Society. The school produced many French-speaking Baptist ministers, and many of its graduates, both francophones and anglophones, went on to become well known in diverse fields in Canada.

Second World War

Feller ceased operations as a school during the Second World War (1942–1946) and was used as a prisoner-of-war camp. It reopened shortly after the war. After the war Feller accepted many English-speaking students and enjoyed considerable success as a truly bilingual institution. At the same time, its board had to face the problem of redefining its original mission. Ultimately it was unable to adapt to the new realities, and it closed in June 1967.

Hostel
The main four-story grey stone building was last used in the summer of 1967 as a hostel for visitors to Montreal's World's Fair: Expo 67. In December 1968 it burned down.  The school church was spared the fire and is still open to the public.

References

Boarding schools in Quebec
Private schools in Quebec
Baptist schools in Canada
Schools in Montérégie
Educational institutions established in 1836
1836 establishments in Canada
Le Haut-Richelieu Regional County Municipality